Babool is a toothpaste brand which was launched in India by Balsara Hygiene in 1987. Babool is made from the bark of the Babool tree, which has traditionally been used to clean teeth in India. The brand was positioned as an economic toothpaste with the tagline "Babool Babool paisa vasool". Babool was relaunched with the tagline "Begin a great day, the Babool way" in 2002, when Babool was Balsara's biggest brand. In 2005, Babool was sold by Balsara to Dabur along with other Balsara toothpaste brands Promise and Meswak in a  deal.

See also

List of toothpaste brands
Index of oral health and dental articles

References

Brands of toothpaste
Oral hygiene
Indian brands
Dabur Group